Seo Ha-joon (born September 19, 1989) is a South Korean actor.

Filmography

Television series

Film

Variety show

Musical theatre

Awards and nominations

References

External links
 

1989 births
Living people
21st-century South Korean male actors
South Korean male film actors
South Korean male television actors
South Korean male stage actors
South Korean male musical theatre actors
South Korean male models
Male actors from Seoul
Models from Seoul